Gar Mangsham Sumnang (? – ?) was a 7th century ce general of the Tibetan Empire. He was active during Namri Songtsen's and Songtsen Gampo's reign.

The Lönchen Thonmyi Tringpo Gyaltsennu tried to overthrow Namri Songtsen, and was detected by him. Sumnang set a trap together with another general khu khri snya dkru' zung, captured him, and cut off his head by sword.

He served as high minister during Songtsen Gampo's reign. After Nyang Mangpoje's execution, he was appointed as Lönchen, and later turned to another general Khyungpo Pungse.

References
Old Tibetan Chronicle, P.T. 1287

7th-century Tibetan people
People of the Tibetan Empire